is a railway station on the Ban'etsu West Line in the town of Nishiaizu, Yama District, Fukushima Prefecture,  Japan, operated by East Japan Railway Company (JR East).

Lines

Station layout
Kami-Nojiri Station has one side platform serving a single bi-directional track. The station is staffed.

History
Kami-Nojiri Station opened on November 1, 1914. The station was absorbed into the JR East network upon the privatization of the Japanese National Railways (JNR) on April 1, 1987.

Passenger statistics
In fiscal 2017, the station was used by an average of 16 passengers daily (boarding passengers only).

Surrounding area
 Aga River

See also
 List of railway stations in Japan

References

External links

 JR East Station information 

Railway stations in Fukushima Prefecture
Ban'etsu West Line
Railway stations in Japan opened in 1914
Nishiaizu, Fukushima